Priscilla Ernst (born 7 September 1971) is a Dutch short track speed skater. She competed at the 1992 Winter Olympics and the 1994 Winter Olympics.

References

External links
 

1971 births
Living people
Dutch female short track speed skaters
Olympic short track speed skaters of the Netherlands
Short track speed skaters at the 1992 Winter Olympics
Short track speed skaters at the 1994 Winter Olympics
Sportspeople from The Hague